Laforêt or Laforet may refer to:

 Laforêt, a village in Wallonia, Belgium
 Laforet, a department store in Shibuya, Tokyo

People
 Carmen Laforet (1921–2004), Spanish existentialist and novelist
 Marie Laforêt (1939–2019), French singer and actress
 Nicholas-Joseph Laforêt (1823–1872), Belgian theologian
 Vincent Laforet (born 1975), Swiss–American photographer and director

See also
 La Forêt (disambiguation)